William Walter "Pudge" Heffelfinger (December 20, 1867 – April 2, 1954), also spelled Hafelfinger, was an American football player and coach.  He is considered the first athlete to play American football professionally, having been paid to play in 1892.

Early life
William Walter Heffelfinger was born in 1867 in the then-small city of Minneapolis, Minnesota, to Christopher B. Heffelfinger and Mary Ellen Totton, both of whom were born in Pennsylvania. Heffelfinger's father came by riverboat to Minneapolis, eventually joining the Union Army at the outset of the Civil War. He was wounded during the Battle of Gettysburg, and after the war started the family shoe manufacturing business.  During Heffelfinger's lifetime, the family rose to prominence in Minneapolis.

As a boy, Heffelfinger was nicknamed "Pudge".  He played baseball and football in high school.  Occasionally, during his junior and senior years of high school he also played for the University of Minnesota, in baseball, as a catcher, and in football, as a halfback.

Playing career

Yale
Heffelfinger, a three-time All-American, played for Walter Camp at Yale College in 1888, 1889, 1890, and 1891, graduating in 1892.

Originally Heffelfinger had planned to attend the University of Minnesota, but in May of his senior year in high school a local Yale alumnus who recognized his athletic talent convinced him to play for Yale instead, and tutored him so he could pass the entrance exam. On Heffelfinger's first day of freshman practice in 1888, the captain of the varsity team, "Pa" Corbin, spotted him on the field and gave him a position on the varsity line. According to Corbin, during Heffelfinger's first year, in spite of his skill, the freshman from the Midwest was not sufficiently ferocious for the Yale style of play until Howard Knapp, one of the graduate coaches, motivated him by an unusual method:

The 1888 Yale team was not only undefeated and untied, but unscored upon, with a season scoring record of 698 to 0.

During Heffelfinger's four years playing for Yale under Camp, the team only lost two games.  His teammates included, besides Pa Corbin: Alonzo Stagg, Charley Gill, Billy Rhodes, Lee "Bum" McClung and George Washington Woodruff. Heffelfinger felt that the greatest of these teams was the undefeated 1891 team he played on his senior year, which he described as "one of the best balanced teams I ever saw."

Heffelfinger's athletic activities at Yale were not limited to football: he lettered in three other sports: rowing, baseball and track, and won the university heavyweight boxing championship.

First professional football player
After leaving Yale, Heffelfinger played amateur football for the Chicago Athletic Association (for which he was compensated with "double expenses", as was a common practice at the time). He was widely considered the best player at the time. Meanwhile, two Pittsburgh teams, the Allegheny Athletic Association (nicknamed the 3As) and the Pittsburgh Athletic Club had a heated rivalry and both were looking for an advantage in their upcoming game. Pittsburgh A.C. offered him $250 to play for them in the game, but he felt the amount was not enough to jeopardize his amateur status. The 3As doubled the amount and on the day of the game, Heffelfinger and two of his Chicago teammates were playing for the 3As. The game was played at Recreation Park, which was located on Pittsburgh's north shore. The spot is marked by a historic marker.

Although the payment for Heffelfinger's play was not published or admitted at the time, his presence set off quite a controversy as Pittsburgh A.C. protested the presence of the Chicago Athletic Association players in their line-up. Allegheny retaliated with the fact that Pittsburgh had imported players as well. The game ended in a 4–0 Allegheny win. Heffelfinger scored the game's only touchdown on a recovered fumble.  A touchdown was only worth four points at the time.

In the 1960s a man known only as "Nelson Ross" walked into the office of Art Rooney, the president of the Pittsburgh Steelers of the National Football League. After a brief discussion, the man gave Rooney a typed, 49-page manuscript about the early history of pro football. Ross' examination of Pittsburgh newspapers indicated that the first pro American football player actually was Pudge Heffelfinger, an all-American guard from Yale, who was hired to play for Allegheny on November 12, 1892, for $500. The Pro Football Hall of Fame soon discovered a page torn from an 1892 account ledger prepared by Allegheny manager, O. D. Thompson, that included the line item: "Game performance bonus to W. Heffelfinger for playing (cash) $500." Though the payment was not verified until the acquisition of an Allegheny Athletic Association expense ledger from the day by the Pro Football Hall of Fame, this fee established Heffelfinger as being the first professional American football player on record.

The week after the game against the P.A.C., Allegheny paid former Princeton end Ben "Sport" Donnelly $250 to play alongside Pudge against Washington & Jefferson College. Despite having two pros in their line-up, Allegheny lost the game, 8–0.

Coaching career

California
Heffelfinger took his first head football coaching job with the University of California, Berkeley for the 1893 football season and was the third person to be assigned to the post. His team achieved a record of 5–1–1.

Lehigh
Heffelfinger was the third head football coach for Lehigh University in Bethlehem, Pennsylvania, and he held that position for the 1894 season.  His overall coaching record at Lehigh was 5 wins and 9 losses.

Minnesota

Heffelfinger also coached the University of Minnesota football team in 1895. He led the team to a 7–3 record in his only season there.  Highlights included victories over rivals University of Wisconsin–Madison and University of Chicago, outscoring their opponents 136 to 58 for the season.

Later life
Heffelfinger married Grace Harriet Pierce in 1901. The couple remained married until his death in 1954.  After his official coaching career ended, Heffelfinger immersed himself in the business world in Minneapolis.  He joined the family shoe manufacturing business.  The business suffered heavily in the Panic of 1907, and was forced into bankruptcy in 1910, as were Heffelfinger and his father.

After the failure of the manufacturing business, Heffelfinger had an active career in real estate, including major commercial deals.  In his real estate work, Heffelfinger is credited with important contributions to the early development of the upper Nicollet Avenue area, with organizing the company which built the 1910 Physicians and Surgeons building, and with bringing the Butler Brothers to Minneapolis.

Heffelfinger was a delegate to the Republican National Convention in 1904 and 1908. He first won elective office in 1924, running against more experienced politicians and easily capturing a seat on the Hennepin County Board of Commissioners. During his first election campaign Heffelfinger competed energetically, and compared politics to football, telling a reporter he would reduce taxes "if I make a touchdown in this political game, which I'll admit is tougher than football, a whole lot."  Heffelfinger continued to serve on the Hennepin County Board for 24 years, including 4 years as board chairman. During Prohibition Heffelfinger ran twice as a "wet" in the Republican primary for Minnesota's 5th congressional district, losing both times to prohibitionist and former Lieutenant Governor William I. Nolan.

Throughout his life, Heffelfinger, maintained a high level of involvement with football. After his professional coaching career ended, he continued for decades to make yearly trips to New Haven to assist the coaching staff. Into his 50s, Heffelfinger not only coached the Bulldogs from the sideline, but scrimmaged with them on the field, showing remarkable toughness. He also played competitively in charity and exhibition games against much younger men, playing his last game at age 65.  From 1935 to 1950, Heffelfinger edited Heffelfinger's Football Facts, a yearly booklet featuring history, rules, statistics, and professional and college schedules for the upcoming season.

Heffelfinger died in Texas on April 2, 1954.

Hall of Fame
Heffelfinger was inducted into the College Football Hall of Fame in 1951. 
 
Despite being one of the earliest pioneers for the professional game, he has still yet to be inducted into the Pro Football Hall of Fame. However, he was inducted into the Pittsburgh Pro Football Hall of Fame in 2015.  He was named one of the 10 inaugural members for the Football Learning Academy's Hall of Honor in 2022, which looks to acknowledge icons not currently inducted in the hall.

Head coaching record

References

External links
 
 

1867 births
1954 deaths
19th-century players of American football
All-American college football players
American football guards
Allegheny Athletic Association players
American people of Swiss descent
California Golden Bears football coaches
Chicago Athletic Association players
College Football Hall of Fame inductees
Lehigh Mountain Hawks football coaches
Minnesota Golden Gophers football coaches
Yale Bulldogs football players
Sports coaches from Minneapolis
Players of American football from Minneapolis